Krutovka is a rural locality (a village) in Mstyora Urban Settlement, Vyaznikovsky District, Vladimir Oblast, Russia. The population was 15 as of 2010.

Geography 
Krutovka is located 29 km northwest of Vyazniki (the district's administrative centre) by road. Zhelobikha is the nearest rural locality.

References 

Rural localities in Vyaznikovsky District